The Gothaer Group is a German insurance company with circa 4.1 million members. Its core businesses are all insurance services. Gothaer Allgemeine Versicherungs AG customers include private clients and small- and medium-sized businesses. They offer their products to private and corporate customers. The customers are carefully secured in instances like: personal or group accidents, motor accidents, property damages, river shipping, robbery and burglary, fire, storm and water damages; Their product offer covers fields of property, health and life insurance. Gothaer insures industrial, business and private customers - with asset management and investment - forming another area of business. The head office is located in Cologne, Germany.

The Gothaer Group reported a net profit of €134 million in 2015. The rate of increase was about 14.5% in comparison to 2014. A part of the profit has been taken for strengthening the companys equity. The income level remained in 2015 nearly the same with a height of 4.5 billion euros.

History

Foundation

In 1820, Ernst Wilhelm Arnoldi established the ‘Feuerversicherungsbank des Deutschen Handelsstandes’ – a company run by merchants, for merchants – in the Thuringian town of Gotha. Gothaer was one of Europe's first interregional mutual insurance companies. Soon, after the foundation of the ’Gothaer Feuerversicherungsbank’, other mutual fire insurance companies were founded – for example: ’Versicherungs-Gesellschaft gegen Feuersgefahr’ or ’Württembergische Privat-Feuerversicherungs-Gesellschaft’. In 1827 Arnoldi sets up a second company, the ‘Gothaer Lebensversicherungsbank für Deutschland’. In 1830 the Gothaer Feuerbank is renamed Gothaer Feuerversicherungsbank für Deutschland.

In 1842 the company faces its first serious challenge – the Great Fire of Hamburg and its devastating consequences. It actually started in Eduard Cohen's cigar factory at Deichstraße 42 or 44 early in the morning of 5 May. The huge fire lasted for four days (till 8 May 1842) and destroyed more or less one third of the old inner city. A large muster of firefighters (overall 1150 Hamburger firefighters) and several helpers were fighting this fire. Below the line, 1749 houses, 3 churches (St. Nikolai, St. Petri, Gertrudkirche) (Hamburg-Uhlenhorst), 2 synagogues, 102 attics, the townhall and a copple of other public buildings have been destroyed. The Great Fire of Hamburg caused a damage with an amount of circa 90 million Mark. One of the biggest historical city museums is the "Museum für Hamburger Geschichte". Its exhibition contains also the important occurrence of the "Hugh Hamburger Fire".

Developments in the 19th and 20th century (From 1900 to 1996) 
In 1902 the Gothaer Lebensversicherungsbank für Deutschland is finally renamed Gothaer Lebensversicherungsbank auf Gegenseitigkeit. In the recent decades, till 1918, the Gothaer Group achieved an insurance portfolio of 1.24 billion (Mark) and an asset of almost 500 billion (Mark). Unfortunately – as a result of the World War I – the company was forced to struggle for its existence and independence. The war caused an inflation whereby the company's insurance portfolio and asset have been devalued. The Gothaer Group managed to cope with this crisis and was able – in the period from 1924 to 1944 – to establish their insurance portfolio of 1.25 billion (Mark). In 1924 the Gothaer Allgemeine Versicherungs AG had been set up. Its main task was to handle the emergent motor insurance business, which contains: accident insurance, liability insurance, transport insurance and automobile insurance. The Gothaer Allgemeine Versicherungs AG was found by  Karls August Friedrich Samwer,  who was the great grandfather of the popular "Samwer-Brothers". In Cooperation with David Schneider and Robert Gentz, the three Samwer-Brothers founded the European electronic commerce fashion company Zalando.

From 1945 on, the Gothaer Feuer was no longer permitted to transact their business operations. At that critical juncture Gotha had been occupied by the ex-Soviet Union. The company finally moved to Cologne on 5 March 1946. After the World War II, a joint working group – between Gothaer and Dresdner Feuerversicherung – was established. In 1946 the portfolios of Dresdner Feuerversicherung were taken over by Gothaer Feuer until 1950. In 1970 the Gothaer Feuerversicherungsbank auf Gegenseitigkeit is renamed to Gothaer Versicherungsbank VVaG. In 1993 Dr. Bernd Meyer took over the management of Gothaer Risk Management GmbH in Cologne. In 1994 IBM took over the data processing centers of Porsche, Continental AG, Air Liquide and Gothaer Insurance.

Developments in the 21st century (From 1997 to the present) 
In 1997 the co-ordination concern Parion has been formed – evolved by the Gothaer chief executive Wolfgang Peiner. The brand name Parion was composed of the terms "Parität" and "Union".  In 1998 the company Asstel is established as the Group's direct insurer. With bonus revenues of 3.9 billion euro in 2000, Parion ranks among to the top 10 biggest German insurers.

From 2005, the Gothaer Kunden-Service-Center GmbH (GKC) – with circa 100 employees – is trying to process the big hurry of applications. Apart from the Gothaer Group also other insurances outsourced some of their services. Gothaer acquires MLP Versicherung AG and renames the company Janitos Versicherung AG in 2005, with its head office in Heidelberg. In 2006 Janitos is established well on the insurance market. In 2006 the Gothaer Lebensversicherung AG finally moves its head office from Göttingen to Cologne. In 2010, as part of its strategy of expanding into the growth regions of Central and Eastern Europe, the Gothaer Group acquires an interest in Polish non-life insurer Polskie Towarzystwo Ubezpieczeń S.A (PTU) that was previously held by Polish chemicals company CIECH S.A. and its subsidiaries. In 2012 – Gothaer enters into the Romanian insurance market by acquiring a majority stake in Platinum Asigurari Reasigurari. In the very samy year the Platinum Asigurari Reasigurari is renamed into Gothaer Asigurari Reasigurari.

In 2013 - Change at the top of the Group. As of 1 January 2014, Dr Werner Görg hands on the baton as Chief Executive to Dr Karsten Eichmann In 2014 the Asstel Lebensversicherung AG is amalgamated into Gothaer Lebensversicherung AG. In 2015 Gothaer has been able to strengthens their equity basis and was gaining more market share in property insurance.

Group structure

Germany

Gothaer Finanzholding AG 
The Gothaer Finanzholding AG is responsible for the financial controlling of the Gothaer Group. Previously Parion Finanzholding AG has been re-branded to Gothaer Finanzholding AG. The company is located in Cologne, Germany. In 2004, the reinsurer Gothaer Rück finally joined up with the Gothaer Finanzholding AG.

Gothaer Lebensversicherung AG: 
The Gothaer Lebensversicherung AG offers different kinds of services in these areas: insurance, pension and asset management. As a German insurance it provides products, which focus on term life, funeral aspects, dread disease, etc. Their enterprise size totals around 540 employees.

Gothaer Krankenversicherung AG 
The Gothaer Krankenversicherung AG is a part of the Gothaer Finanzholding AG. 2013 the company had nearly 6.000 employees. Their services include: ambulant or stationary health insurance, sick pay insurance, group insurance, nursing care insurance, etc. The gross dues of the Gothaer Krankenversicherung had been estimated at 875 million euros by Michael Kurtenbach (chairman) in 2014. In the very same year the number of customers who have a supplementary insurance, had increased up to 422 thousand customers. In a ranking study of the Institut für Vorsorge und Finanzplanung GmbH (IVFP), the Gothaer Pflegetagegeld-Versicherung (of the Gothaer Krankenversicherung AG) had been honored cause of its high flexibility with an overall mark of 1.9. From September 2015, the Gothaer Krankenversicherung AG offers their clients a special service - from this time on, the customers have been able to submit their bills, simply and without any paper work, by the Gothaer app. The transmission takes place either by scanning the QR code, which is printed on the bill, or via the app's picture function.

Asstel 
On behalf of n-tv, the Deutsches Institut für Service-Qualität analyzed 31 automobile insurances in total. As one of the top two products, according to the cost-benefit ratio, approved the Komfort-Tarif of the direct insurer Asstel. In the end Asstel achieved the second rang in the overall results. In 2014 the Gothaer Group amalgamated Asstel and Gothar. Clients can earn bonus miles from Miles & More, if they effect a new insurance.

Janitos Versicherung AG 
Previously MLP Versicherung AG (founded in 2000) has been alienated to the Gothaer Group and re-branded to Janitos Versicherung AG in 2015. For its customers it remains an insurance for target-group-specific finance businesses. Its head office is located in Heidelberg, Germany. In 2013 Wolfgang Bach joins the executive board, to which Peter Schneider, Klaus-Christoph Reichert und Stephan Oetzel already belong.

Austria 
In 1982 the Gothaer Lebensversicherung AG has been set up in Austria. Currently the Austrian establishment concentrates on the coverage of biometric risks. From 1 July 2016 on, Helmut Karner (56 years old) has taken over the leadership of distribution.

Romania 
Gothaer Asigurari Reasiguari S.A. acts as a subsidiary company of the Gothaer Group (Gothaer Finanzholding AG). Previously SC CLAL Romania Asigurari-Resigurari SA has been re-branded to Gothaer Asigurari Reasiguari S.A. in February 2012. The SC CLAL Romania Asigurari-Resigurari SA was founded in 2006.

Poland 
Gothaer Towarzystwo Ubezpieczen S.A. was founded in 1990. Its head office is located in Warsaw, Poland. Previously Polskie Towarzystwo Ubezpieczen S.A. changed its name to in October 2012. In the period from September 2013 to September 2015, the INTERSPORT Polska S.A. managed to find a general agreement with the Gothaer Towarzystwo Ubezpieczen S.A. This agreement contains a general coverage on all risks, like theft and a basic guarantee sum based on civil liability insurance.

External agency ratings 
Gothaer is appraised annually by independent rating agencies such as Fitch and Standard & Poor's. In September 2015 Fitch Ratings affirmed both, the Gothaer Allgemeine Versicherung and the Gothaer Lebensversicherung, at 'A'.

Sustainability as a business field of the future 
Gothaer insures wind power plants all over the world over and became a market leader in this insurance part. In 2014 the Gothaer Insurance Group became an important strategic partner of the juwi subsidiary juwi renewable IPP GmbH & Co. KG, in which the company planned to invest up to €150 million in the expansion of juwi IPP's power plant park. In 2015 Gothaer loaned €150 million to the company Capital Stage and was able to gain a 4 & return out of that project. Capital Stage is operating with wind and solar assets. One current and huge offshore wind project has been invested by the Gothaer Group. This MW Nordergruende project will take place in the German North Sea, developed by Wpd AG.

References

External links 
 Gothaer Group
 Key Business
 Gothaer Romania
 Gothaer Poland 

Financial services companies established in 1820
Insurance companies of Germany
German companies established in 1820
Companies based in Cologne